The White House Student Film Festival was an annual event held by the White House and co-sponsored by the American Film Institute. During the inaugural festival in 2014, students in Kindergarten through 12th Grade were able to submit short films about "why technology is so important, and how it will change the educational experience for kids in the future." 16 videos were selected to be screened out of over 2,500 submitted videos. Several celebrity guests were in attendance, including Kal Penn, Neil DeGrasse Tyson, and Bill Nye.

The 16 video selections were sorted into four categories: Young Visionaries, Future Innovators, World of Tomorrow, and Building Bridges.

The second year of the festival took place at the White House and the Newseum in Washington, DC on March 20 and 21, 2015, with a theme of "the Impact of Giving Back".

In 2016, the event was held on October 2, immediately preceding the White House's South by South Lawn festival. The theme was "The World I Want to Live In".

2014 Video Selections

Young Visionaries 

 Discovery by Tiffany Lin
 Thru the Lens of a Tiger by Alicia Oluhara and Jason Perry
 Stay Curious: Technology in the Classroom by Kayla Briet
 Teleportation Investigation of 2014 by The Extrazzlers - Caroline Proffit, Elizabeth Russell, Natalie Koeritzer, and Lexus Wolf
 Beyond the Crossfire by Gabriel Garcia, Tirsa Mercado, Rachel Walden, and High Tech High
 Technology, Documentary, My Dad, and Me by Shelly Ortiz

Future Innovators 

 PIP by Richard White, Nicolas Ramey and Emil Willmann
 Technology and Me by East Silver Spring Elementary 1st Grade
 Art Tech Collaboration by Highlands and Mill Street Elementary Schools

World of Tomorrow 

 Tomorrow's Classroom by Alexander Emerson
 Technology In Education: A Future Classroom by Daniel Nemroff
 Full S[T]EAM Ahead – How Technology Rocks the Classroom by Miles Pilchik, Gabrielle Nafie, and the children of SciTech Kids

Building Bridges 

 Double Time by Joshua Leong and Stephen Sheridan
 Hello From Malaysia by Kira Bursky
 Alex by Aaron Buangsuwon and Alex Buangsuwon
 A Day In the Life of Kyle by Justin Etzine, Kyle Weintraub, Marni Rosenblatt, and Rachel Huss

References 

Film festivals in Washington, D.C.
Film festivals established in 2014